Kwesi Nii-Lante Boakye (born April 6, 1999) is an American actor. He is best known for voicing Darwin, Gumball's best friend and adoptive brother and Gossamer on the Cartoon Network animated shows The Amazing World of Gumball and The Looney Tunes Show, respectively. He also played Manny in the 2009 Tyler Perry film I Can Do Bad All By Myself, and voiced The Passenger in Bravest Warriors.

He is the youngest of three brothers who are also actors; Kwame Boateng, and Kofi Siriboe. Boakye's family is originally from Ghana.

Filmography

Film and television

References

External links
 
 
 Kwesi Boakye at Blackcelebkids.com
 Kwesi Boakye Official Myspace

1999 births
Living people
21st-century American male actors
21st-century American singers
American male child actors
American male film actors
American male television actors
American male voice actors
American people of Ghanaian descent
Male actors from Los Angeles